This is the results breakdown of the local elections held in the Community of Madrid on 8 May 1983. The following tables show detailed results in the autonomous community's most populous municipalities, sorted alphabetically.

Overall

City control
The following table lists party control in the most populous municipalities, including provincial capitals (shown in bold). Gains for a party are displayed with the cell's background shaded in that party's colour.

Municipalities

Alcalá de Henares
Population: 137,169

Alcobendas
Population: 63,731

Alcorcón
Population: 140,957

Coslada
Population: 53,730

Fuenlabrada
Population: 78,096

Getafe
Population: 126,558

Leganés
Population: 163,910

Madrid

Population: 3,158,818

Móstoles
Population: 150,259

Parla
Population: 56,318

Torrejón de Ardoz
Population: 75,599

See also
1983 Madrilenian regional election

References

Madrid
1983